"Baby Blue" is a song released in 1961 by The Echoes. It was written by Long Island assistant high school principal Sam Guilino and music teacher Val Lagueux. The song spent 12 weeks on the Billboard Hot 100 chart peaking at No. 12, while reaching No. 8 on Canada's CHUM Hit Parade.  The song is noted for the Echoes spelling out the name of "Baby Blue" as "B B A B Y, B B L U E".

"Baby Blue" was ranked No. 66 on Billboards end of year "Hot 100 for 1961 - Top Sides of the Year".

The Echoes released a yuletide version of the song as "Merry Christmas, Baby Blue", in 1961, complete with sleigh bells, and an electronic keyboard that impersonates the festive sounds of Christmas chimes. It ends with a whisper of the title song.

Chart performance

References

1961 songs
1961 singles
Doo-wop songs